Bryce Tyler Jones Jr. (born October 12, 1994), known as Brajs Džons, is an American professional basketball player for Limoges CSP of the LNB Pro A.

Playing career 
On August 3, 2019, Jones signed a one-year contract with Borac Čačak. On July 24, 2020, he signed a one-year contract extension with Borac.

On June 15, 2021, Jones signed a contract with FMP. He parted ways with FMP in May 2022.

On June 27, 2022, Jones signed a contract with Limoges CSP of the LNB Pro A.

References

External links 
 Profile at eurobasket.com
 Profile at realgm.com

1994 births
Living people
21st-century African-American sportspeople
ABA League players
American expatriate basketball people in Montenegro
American expatriate basketball people in Serbia
American men's basketball players
African-American basketball players
Basketball League of Serbia players
Basketball players from New York City
Jones County Bobcats men's basketball
KK Borac Čačak players
KK FMP players
Limoges CSP players
Murray State Racers men's basketball players
Point guards
Sportspeople from Brooklyn